Jürgen Habermas (born 18 June 1929) is a German philosopher and social theorist in the tradition of critical theory and pragmatism. His work addresses communicative rationality and the public sphere.

Associated with the Frankfurt School, Habermas's work focuses on the foundations of epistemology and social theory, the analysis of advanced capitalism and democracy, the rule of law in a critical social-evolutionary context, albeit within the confines of the natural law tradition, and contemporary politics, particularly German politics. Habermas's theoretical system is devoted to revealing the possibility of reason, emancipation, and rational-critical communication latent in modern institutions and in the human capacity to deliberate and pursue rational interests. Habermas is known for his work on the concept of modernity, particularly with respect to the discussions of rationalization originally set forth by Max Weber. He has been influenced by American pragmatism, action theory, and poststructuralism.

Biography

Habermas was born in Düsseldorf, Rhine Province, in 1929. He was born with a cleft palate and had corrective surgery twice during childhood. Habermas argues that his speech disability made him think differently about the importance of deep dependence and of communication. He grew up in Gummersbach.

As a young teenager, he was profoundly affected by World War II. Until his graduation from grammar school, Habermas lived in Gummersbach, near Cologne. His father, Ernst Habermas, was executive director of the Cologne Chamber of Industry and Commerce, and was described by Habermas as a Nazi sympathizer and, from 1933, a member of the NSDAP. Habermas himself was a Jungvolkführer, a leader of the German Jungvolk, which was a section of the Hitler Youth. He was brought up in a staunchly Protestant milieu, his grandfather being the director of the seminary in Gummersbach. He studied at the universities of Göttingen (1949/50), Zurich (1950/51), and Bonn (1951–54) and earned a doctorate in philosophy from Bonn in 1954 with a dissertation written on the conflict between "the Absolute" and history in Schelling's thought, entitled,  ("The Absolute and History: On the Schism in Schelling's Thought"). His dissertation committee included Erich Rothacker and Oskar Becker.

From 1956 on, he studied philosophy and sociology under the critical theorists Max Horkheimer and Theodor W. Adorno at the Goethe University Frankfurt's Institute for Social Research, but because of a rift between the two over his dissertation—Horkheimer had made unacceptable demands for revision—as well as his own belief that the Frankfurt School had become paralyzed with political skepticism and disdain for modern culture, he finished his habilitation in political science at the University of Marburg under the Marxist Wolfgang Abendroth. His habilitation work was entitled  (published in English translation in 1989 as The Structural Transformation of the Public Sphere: An Inquiry into a Category of Bourgeois Society). It is a detailed social history of the development of the bourgeois public sphere from its origins in the 18th century salons up to its transformation through the influence of capital-driven mass media. In 1961 he became a Privatdozent in Marburg, and—in a move that was highly unusual for the German academic scene of that time—he was offered the position of "extraordinary professor" (professor without chair) of philosophy at the University of Heidelberg (at the instigation of Hans-Georg Gadamer and Karl Löwith) in 1962, which he accepted. In this same year he gained his first serious public attention, in Germany, with the publication of his habilitation. In 1964, strongly supported by Adorno, Habermas returned to Frankfurt to take over Horkheimer's chair in philosophy and sociology. The philosopher Albrecht Wellmer was his assistant in Frankfurt from 1966 to 1970.

He accepted the position of Director of the Max Planck Institute for the Study of the Scientific-Technical World in Starnberg (near Munich) in 1971, and worked there until 1983, two years after the publication of his magnum opus, The Theory of Communicative Action. He was elected a Foreign Honorary Member of the American Academy of Arts and Sciences in 1984.

Habermas then returned to his chair at Frankfurt and the directorship of the Institute for Social Research. Since retiring from Frankfurt in 1993, Habermas has continued to publish extensively. He also holds the position of "permanent visiting" professor at Northwestern University in Evanston, Illinois, and "Theodor Heuss Professor" at The New School, New York.

Habermas was awarded the Prince of Asturias Award in Social Sciences of 2003. Habermas was also the 2004 Kyoto Laureate in the Arts and Philosophy section. He traveled to San Diego and on 5 March 2005, as part of the University of San Diego's Kyoto Symposium, gave a speech entitled The Public Role of Religion in Secular Context, regarding the evolution of separation of church and state from neutrality to intense secularism. He received the 2005 Holberg International Memorial Prize (about €520,000). In 2007, Habermas was listed as the seventh most-cited author in the humanities (including the social sciences) by The Times Higher Education Guide, ahead of Max Weber and behind Erving Goffman. Bibliometric studies demonstrate his continuing influence and increasing relevance.

Jürgen Habermas is the father of Rebekka Habermas, historian of German social and cultural history and professor of modern history at the University of Göttingen.

Teacher and mentor
Habermas was a famed teacher and mentor. Among his most prominent students were the pragmatic philosopher Herbert Schnädelbach (theorist of discourse distinction and rationality), the political sociologist Claus Offe (professor at the Hertie School of Governance in Berlin), the social philosopher Johann Arnason (professor at La Trobe University and chief editor of the journal Thesis Eleven), the social philosopher Hans-Herbert Kögler (Chair of Philosophy at the University of North Florida), the sociological theorist Hans Joas (professor at the University of Erfurt and at the University of Chicago), the theorist of societal evolution Klaus Eder, the social philosopher Axel Honneth, the political theorist David Rasmussen  (professor at Boston College and chief editor of the journal "Philosophy & Social Criticism"), the environmental ethicist Konrad Ott, the anarcho-capitalist philosopher Hans-Hermann Hoppe (who came to reject much of Habermas's thought), the American philosopher Thomas McCarthy, the co-creator of mindful inquiry in social research Jeremy J. Shapiro, the political philosopher Cristina Lafont (Harold H. and Virginia Anderson Professor of Philosophy at Northwestern University), and the assassinated Serbian prime minister Zoran Đinđić.

Philosophy and social theory
Habermas has constructed a comprehensive framework of philosophy and social theory drawing on a number of intellectual traditions:
 the German philosophical thought of Immanuel Kant, Friedrich Schelling, G. W. F. Hegel, Wilhelm Dilthey, Edmund Husserl and Hans-Georg Gadamer
 the Marxian tradition—both the theory of Karl Marx himself as well as the critical neo-Marxian theory of the Frankfurt School, i.e. Max Horkheimer, Theodor Adorno and Herbert Marcuse.
 the sociological theories of Max Weber, Émile Durkheim and George Herbert Mead
 the linguistic philosophy and speech act theories of Ludwig Wittgenstein, J. L. Austin, P. F. Strawson, Stephen Toulmin and John Searle
 the developmental psychology of Jean Piaget and Lawrence Kohlberg
 the American pragmatist tradition of Charles Sanders Peirce and John Dewey
 the sociological social systems theory of Talcott Parsons and Niklas Luhmann
 Neo-Kantian thought

Jürgen Habermas considers his major contribution to be the development of the concept and theory of communicative reason or communicative rationality, which distinguishes itself from the rationalist tradition, by locating rationality in structures of interpersonal linguistic communication rather than in the structure of the cosmos. This social theory advances the goals of human emancipation, while maintaining an inclusive universalist moral framework. This framework rests on the argument called universal pragmatics—that all speech acts have an inherent telos (the Greek word for "purpose")—the goal of mutual understanding, and that human beings possess the communicative competence to bring about such understanding. Habermas built the framework out of the speech-act philosophy of Ludwig Wittgenstein, J. L. Austin and John Searle, the sociological theory of the interactional constitution of mind and self of George Herbert Mead, the theories of moral development of Jean Piaget and Lawrence Kohlberg, and the discourse ethics of his Frankfurt colleague and fellow student Karl-Otto Apel.

Habermas's works resonate within the traditions of Kant and the Enlightenment and of democratic socialism through his emphasis on the potential for transforming the world and arriving at a more humane, just, and egalitarian society through the realization of the human potential for reason, in part through discourse ethics. While Habermas has stated that the Enlightenment is an "unfinished project," he argues it should be corrected and complemented, not discarded. In this he distances himself from the Frankfurt School, criticizing it, as well as much of postmodernist thought, for excessive pessimism, radicalism, and exaggerations.

Within sociology, Habermas's major contribution was the development of a comprehensive theory of societal evolution and modernization focusing on the difference between communicative rationality and rationalization on one hand and strategic/instrumental rationality and rationalization on the other. This includes a critique from a communicative standpoint of the differentiation-based theory of social systems developed by Niklas Luhmann, a student of Talcott Parsons.

His defence of modernity and civil society has been a source of inspiration to others, and is considered a major philosophical alternative to the varieties of poststructuralism. He has also offered an influential analysis of late capitalism.

Habermas perceives the rationalization, humanization and democratization of society in terms of the institutionalization of the potential for rationality that is inherent in the communicative competence that is unique to the human species. Habermas contends that communicative competence has developed through the course of evolution, but in contemporary society it is often suppressed or weakened by the way in which major domains of social life, such as the market, the state, and organizations, have been given over to or taken over by strategic/instrumental rationality, so that the logic of the system supplants that of the lifeworld.

Reconstructive science
Habermas introduces the concept of "reconstructive science" with a double purpose: to place the "general theory of society" between philosophy and social science and re-establish the rift between the "great theorization" and the "empirical research".
The model of "rational reconstructions" represents the main thread of the surveys about the "structures" of the world of life ("culture", "society" and "personality") and their respective "functions" (cultural reproductions, social integrations and socialization). For this purpose, the dialectics between "symbolic representation" of "the structures subordinated to all worlds of
life" ("internal relationships") and the "material reproduction" of the social systems in their complex ("external relationships" between social systems and environment) has to be considered.

This model finds an application, above all, in the "theory of the social evolution", starting from the reconstruction of the necessary conditions for a phylogeny of the socio-cultural life forms (the "hominization") until an analysis of the development of "social formations", which Habermas subdivides into primitive, traditional, modern and contemporary formations.
"This paper is an attempt, primarily, to formalize the model of "reconstruction of the logic of development" of "social formations" summed up by Habermas through the differentiation between vital world and social systems (and, within them, through the "rationalization of the world of life" and the "growth in complexity of the social systems"). Secondly, it tries to offer some methodological clarifications about the "explanation of the dynamics" of "historical processes" and, in particular, about the "theoretical meaning" of the evolutional theory's propositions.  Even if the German sociologist considers that the "ex-post rational reconstructions" and "the models system/environment" cannot have a complete "historiographical application", these certainly act as a general premise in the argumentative structure of the "historical explanation"".

The public sphere

In The Structural Transformation of the Public Sphere, Habermas argues that prior to the 18th century, European culture had been dominated by a "representational" culture, where one party sought to "represent" itself on its audience by overwhelming its subjects. As an example of "representational" culture, Habermas argued that Louis XIV's Palace of Versailles was meant to show the greatness of the French state and its King by overpowering the senses of visitors to the Palace. Habermas identifies "representational" culture as corresponding to the feudal stage of development according to Marxist theory, arguing that the coming of the capitalist stage of development marked the appearance of Öffentlichkeit (the public sphere). In the culture characterized by Öffentlichkeit, there occurred a public space outside of the control by the state, where individuals exchanged views and knowledge.

In Habermas's view, the growth in newspapers, journals, reading clubs, Masonic lodges, and coffeehouses in 18th-century Europe, all in different ways, marked the gradual replacement of "representational" culture with Öffentlichkeit culture. Habermas argued that the essential characteristic of the Öffentlichkeit culture was its "critical" nature. Unlike "representational" culture where only one party was active and the other passive, the Öffentlichkeit culture was characterized by a dialogue as individuals either met in conversation, or exchanged views via the print media. Habermas maintains that as Britain was the most liberal country in Europe, the culture of the public sphere emerged there first around 1700, and the growth of Öffentlichkeit culture took place over most of the 18th century in Continental Europe. In his view, the French Revolution was in large part caused by the collapse of "representational" culture, and its replacement by Öffentlichkeit culture. Though Habermas's main concern in The Structural Transformation of the Public Sphere was to expose what he regarded as the deceptive nature of free institutions in the West, his book had a major effect on the historiography of the French Revolution.

According to Habermas, a variety of factors resulted in the eventual decay of the public sphere, including the growth of a commercial mass media, which turned the critical public into a passive consumer public; and the welfare state, which merged the state with society so thoroughly that the public sphere was squeezed out. It also turned the "public sphere" into a site of self-interested contestation for the resources of the state rather than a space for the development of a public-minded rational consensus.

His most known work to date, the Theory of Communicative Action (1981), is based on an adaptation of Talcott Parsons AGIL Paradigm. In this work, Habermas voiced criticism of the process of modernization, which he saw as inflexible direction forced through by economic and administrative rationalization. Habermas outlined how our everyday lives are penetrated by formal systems as parallel to development of the welfare state, corporate capitalism and mass consumption. These reinforcing trends rationalize public life. Disfranchisement of citizens occurs as political parties and interest groups become rationalized and representative democracy replaces participatory one. In consequence, boundaries between public and private, the individual and society, the system and the lifeworld are deteriorating. Democratic public life cannot develop where matters of public importance are not discussed by citizens. An "ideal speech situation" requires participants to have the same capacities of discourse, social equality and their words are not confused by ideology or other errors. In this version of the consensus theory of truth Habermas maintains that truth is what would be agreed upon in an ideal speech situation.

Habermas has expressed optimism about the possibility of the revival of the public sphere. He discerns a hope for the future where the representative democracy-reliant nation-state is replaced by a deliberative democracy-reliant political organism based on the equal rights and obligations of citizens. In such a direct democracy-driven system, the activist public sphere is needed for debates on matters of public importance as well as the mechanism for that discussion to affect the decision-making process.

Habermas versus postmodernists
Habermas offered some early criticisms in an essay, "Modernity versus Postmodernity" (1981), which has achieved wide recognition. In that essay, Habermas raises the issue of whether, in light of the failures of the twentieth century, we "should try to hold on to the intentions of the Enlightenment, feeble as they may be, or should we declare the entire project of modernity a lost cause?" Habermas refuses to give up on the possibility of a rational, "scientific" understanding of the life-world.

Habermas has several main criticisms of postmodernism:

 Postmodernists are equivocal about whether they are producing serious theory or literature;
 Postmodernists are animated by normative sentiments, but the nature of those sentiments remains concealed from the reader;
 Postmodernism has a totalizing perspective that fails "to differentiate phenomena and practices that occur within modern society";
 Postmodernists ignore everyday life and its practices, which Habermas finds absolutely central.

Key dialogues and engagement with politics

Positivism dispute 

The positivism dispute was a political-philosophical dispute between the critical rationalists (Karl Popper, Hans Albert) and the Frankfurt School (Theodor Adorno, Jürgen Habermas) in 1961, about the methodology of the social sciences. It grew into a broad discussion within German sociology from 1961 to 1969.

Habermas and Gadamer 
There is a controversy between Habermas and Hans-Georg Gadamer about limits of hermeneutics. Gadamer completed his magnum opus, Truth and Method  in 1960, and engaged in his debate with Habermas over the possibility of transcending history and culture in order to find a truly objective position from which to critique society.

During the 1960s, Gadamer supported Habermas and advocated for him to be offered a job at Heidelberg before he had completed his Habilitation, despite Max Horkheimer's objections. While they both criticized positivism, a philosophical disagreement arose between them in the 1970s. This disagreement expanded the scope of Gadamer's philosophical influence. Despite fundamental agreements between them, such as starting from the hermeneutic tradition and returning to Greek practical philosophy, Habermas argued that Gadamer's emphasis on tradition and prejudice blinded him to the ideological operation of power. Habermas believed that Gadamer's approach failed to enable critical reflection on the sources of ideology in society. He accused Gadamer of endorsing a dogmatic stance toward tradition, which made it difficult to identify distortions in understanding. Gadamer countered that refusing the universal nature of hermeneutics was the more dogmatic stance because it affirmed the deception that the subject can free itself from the past.

Habermas and Foucault 

There is a dispute concerning whether Michel Foucault's ideas of "power analytics" and "genealogy" or Jürgen Habermas's ideas of "communicative rationality" and "discourse ethics" provide a better critique of the nature of power in society. The debate compares and evaluates the central ideas of Habermas and Foucault as they pertain to questions of power, reason, ethics, modernity, democracy, civil society, and social action.

Habermas and Luhmann 
Niklas Luhmann proposed that society could be successfully analyzed through systems theory. There is a conflict between Jürgen Habermas's theory of communicative action and Luhmann's systems theory.

Habermas and Apel 
Habermas and Karl-Otto Apel both support a postmetaphysical, universal moral theory, but they disagree on the nature and justification of this principle. Habermas disagrees with Apel's view that the principle is a transcendental condition of human activity, while Apel asserts that it is. They each criticize the other's position. Habermas argues that Apel is too concerned with transcendental conditions, while Apel argues that Habermas doesn't value critical discourse enough.

Habermas and Rawls 

There is a debate between Habermas and John Rawls. The debate centers around the question of how to do political philosophy under conditions of cultural pluralism, if the aim of political philosophy is to uncover the normative foundation of a modern liberal democracy. Habermas believes that Rawls's view is inconsistent with the idea of popular sovereignty, while Rawls argues that political legitimacy is solely a matter of sound moral reasoning or that democratic will formation has been unduly downgraded in his theory.

Historikerstreit (Historians' Quarrel)

Habermas is famous as a public intellectual as well as a scholar; most notably, in the 1980s he used the popular press to attack the German historians Ernst Nolte, Michael Stürmer, Klaus Hildebrand and Andreas Hillgruber. Habermas first expressed his views on the above-mentioned historians in the Die Zeit on 11 July 1986 in a feuilleton (a type of culture and arts opinion essay in German newspapers) entitled "A Kind of Settlement of Damages". Habermas criticized Nolte, Hildebrand, Stürmer and Hillgruber for "apologistic" history writing in regard to the Nazi era, and for seeking to "close Germany's opening to the West" that in Habermas's view had existed since 1945.

Habermas argued that Nolte, Stürmer, Hildebrand and Hillgruber had tried to detach Nazi rule and the Holocaust from the mainstream of German history, explain away Nazism as a reaction to Bolshevism, and partially rehabilitate the reputation of the Wehrmacht (German Army) during World War II. Habermas wrote that Stürmer was trying to create a "vicarious religion" in German history which, together with the work of Hillgruber, glorifying the last days of the German Army on the Eastern Front, was intended to serve as a "kind of NATO philosophy colored with German nationalism". About Hillgruber's statement that Adolf Hitler wanted to exterminate the Jews "because only such a 'racial revolution' could lend permanence to the world-power status of his Reich", Habermas wrote: "Since Hillgruber does not use the verb in the subjunctive, one does not know whether the historian has adopted the perspective of the particulars this time too".

Habermas wrote: "The unconditional opening of the Federal Republic to the political culture of the West is the greatest intellectual achievement of our postwar period; my generation should be especially proud of this. This event cannot and should not be stabilized by a kind of NATO philosophy colored with German nationalism. The opening of the Federal Republic has been achieved precisely by overcoming the ideology of Central Europe that our revisionists are trying to warm up for us with their geopolitical drumbeat about "the old geographically central position of the Germans in Europe" (Stürmer) and "the reconstruction of the destroyed European Center" (Hillgruber). The only patriotism that will not estrange us from the West is a constitutional patriotism."

The so-called Historikerstreit ("Historians' Quarrel") was not at all one-sided, because Habermas was himself attacked by scholars like Joachim Fest, Hagen Schulze, Horst Möller, Imanuel Geiss and Klaus Hildebrand. In turn, Habermas was supported by historians such as Martin Broszat, Eberhard Jäckel, Hans Mommsen, and Hans-Ulrich Wehler.

Habermas and Derrida
Habermas and Jacques Derrida engaged in a series of disputes beginning in the 1980s and culminating in a mutual understanding and friendship in the late 1990s that lasted until Derrida's death in 2004. They originally came in contact when Habermas invited Derrida to speak at The University of Frankfurt in 1984. The next year Habermas published "Beyond a Temporalized Philosophy of Origins: Derrida" in The Philosophical Discourse of Modernity in which he described Derrida's method as being unable to provide a foundation for social critique. Derrida, citing Habermas as an example, remarked that, "those who have accused me of reducing philosophy to literature or logic to rhetoric ... have visibly and carefully avoided reading me". After Derrida's final rebuttal in 1989 the two philosophers did not continue, but, as Derrida described it, groups in the academy "conducted a kind of 'war', in which we ourselves never took part, either personally or directly".

At the end of the 1990s, Habermas approached Derrida at a party held at an American university where both were lecturing. They then met at Paris over dinner, and participated afterwards in many joint projects. In 2000 they held a joint seminar on problems of philosophy, right, ethics, and politics at the University of Frankfurt. In December 2000, in Paris, Habermas gave a lecture entitled "How to answer the ethical question?" at the Judeities. Questions for Jacques Derrida conference organized by Joseph Cohen and Raphael Zagury-Orly. Following the lecture by Habermas, both thinkers engaged in a very heated debate on Heidegger and the possibility of Ethics. The conference volume was published at the Editions Galilée (Paris) in 2002, and subsequently in English at Fordham University Press (2007).

In the aftermath of the 11 September attacks, Derrida and Habermas laid out their individual opinions on 9/11 and the War on Terror in Giovanna Borradori's Philosophy in a Time of Terror: Dialogues with Jürgen Habermas and Jacques Derrida. In early 2003, both Habermas and Derrida were very active in opposing the coming Iraq War; in a manifesto that later became the book Old Europe, New Europe, Core Europe, the two called for a tighter unification of the states of the European Union in order to create a power capable of opposing American foreign policy. Derrida wrote a foreword expressing his unqualified subscription to Habermas's declaration of February 2003 ("February 15, or, What Binds Europeans Together: Plea for a Common Foreign Policy, Beginning in Core Europe") in the book, which was a reaction to the Bush administration's demands upon European nations for support in the coming Iraq War. Habermas has offered further context for this declaration in an interview.

Religious dialogue 
Habermas's attitudes toward religion have changed throughout the years. Analyst Phillippe Portier identifies three phases in Habermas's attitude towards this social sphere: the first, in the decade of 1980, when the younger Jürgen, in the spirit of Marx, argued against religion seeing it as an "alienating reality" and "control tool"; the second phase, from the mid-1980s to the beginning of the 21st Century, when he stopped discussing it and, as a secular commentator, relegated it to matters of private life; and the third, from then until now, when Habermas saw a positive social role of religion.

In an interview in 1999 Habermas had stated:

The original German (from the Habermas Forum website) of the disputed quotation is:

This statement has been misquoted in a number of articles and books, where Habermas instead is quoted for saying:

In his book Zwischen Naturalismus und Religion (Between Naturalism and Religion, 2005), Habermas stated that the forces of religious strength, as a result of multiculturalism and immigration, are stronger than in previous decades, and, therefore, there is a need of tolerance which must be understood as a two-way street: secular people need to tolerate the role of religious people in the public square and vice versa.

In early 2007, Ignatius Press published a dialogue between Habermas and the then Prefect of the Congregation for the Doctrine of the Faith of the Holy Office Joseph Ratzinger (elected as Pope Benedict XVI in 2005), entitled The Dialectics of Secularization. The dialogue took place on 14 January 2004 after an invitation to both thinkers by the Catholic Academy of Bavaria in Munich. It addressed contemporary questions such as:
 Is a public culture of reason and ordered liberty possible in our post-metaphysical age?
 Is philosophy permanently cut adrift from its grounding in being and anthropology?
 Does this decline of rationality signal an opportunity or a deep crisis for religion itself?

In this debate a shift of Habermas became evident—in particular, his rethinking of the public role of religion. Habermas stated that he wrote as a "methodological atheist," which means that when doing philosophy or social science, he presumed nothing about particular religious beliefs. Yet while writing from this perspective his evolving position towards the role of religion in society led him to some challenging questions, and as a result conceding some ground in his dialogue with the future Pope, that would seem to have consequences which further complicated the positions he holds about a communicative rational solution to the problems of modernity. Habermas believes that even for self-identified liberal thinkers, "to exclude religious voices from the public square is highly illiberal."

In addition, Habermas has popularized the concept of "post-secular" society, to refer to current times in which the idea of modernity is perceived as unsuccessful and at times, morally failed, so that, rather than a stratification or separation, a new peaceful dialogue and coexistence between faith and reason must be sought in order to learn mutually.

Socialist dialogue
Habermas has sided with other 20th-century commentators on Marx such as Hannah Arendt who have indicated concerns with the limits of totalitarian perspectives often associated with Marx's apparent over-estimation of the emancipatory potential of the forces of production. Arendt had presented this in her book The Origins of Totalitarianism and Habermas extends this critique in his writings on functional reductionism in the life-world in his Lifeworld and System: A Critique of Functionalist Reason. As Habermas states:

Habermas reiterated the positions that what refuted Marx and his theory of class struggle was the "pacification of class conflict" by the welfare state, which had developed in the West "since 1945", thanks to "a reformist relying on the instruments of Keynesian economics". Italian philosopher and historian Domenico Losurdo criticised the main point of these claims as "marked by the absence of a question that should be obvious:— Was the advent of the welfare state the inevitable result of a tendency inherent in capitalism? Or was it the result of political and social mobilization by the subaltern classes—in the final analysis, of a class struggle? Had the German philosopher posed this question, perhaps he would have avoided assuming the permanence of the welfare state, whose precariousness and progressive dismantlement are now obvious to everyone".

Controversy about wars 
In 1999, Habermas also addressed the Kosovo War. Habermas defended NATO's intervention in an article for Die Zeit, which stirred controversy.

In 2001, Habermas argued that the United States should not go to war in Iraq.

European Union 
During the European debt crisis, Habermas criticized Angela Merkel's leadership in Europe, In 2013, Habermas clashed with Wolfgang Streeck, who argued the kind of European federalism espoused by Habermas as the root of the continent's crisis.

Awards

 1974: Hegel Prize
 1976: Sigmund Freud Prize
 1980: Theodor W. Adorno Award
 1985: Geschwister-Scholl-Preis for his work, Die neue Unübersichtlichkeit
 1986: Gottfried Wilhelm Leibniz Prize
 1987: The Sonning Prize awarded biennially for outstanding contributions to European culture
 1995: Karl Jaspers Prize
 1999: Theodor Heuss Prize
 2001: Peace Prize of the German Book Trade
 2003: The Prince of Asturias Foundation in Social Sciences
 2004: Kyoto Prize in Arts and Philosophy (50 million Yen)
 2005: Holberg International Memorial Prize (520,000 Euro)
 2006: Bruno Kreisky Award
 2008: European Prize for Political Culture (Hans Ringier Foundation) at the Locarno Film Festival (50,000 Euro)
 2010: Ulysses Medal, University College Dublin
 2011: 
 2012: 
 2012: Heinrich Heine Prize
 2012: 
 2013: Erasmus Prize
 2015: Kluge Prize
 2021: Sheikh Zayed Book Award (declined, citing the UAE's political system as a repressive non-democracy)

Major works

 The Structural Transformation of the Public Sphere (1962) 
 Theory and Practice (1963)
 On the Logic of the Social Sciences (1967)
 Toward a Rational Society (1968)
 Technology and Science as Ideology (1968)
 Knowledge and Human Interests (1971, German 1968)
 Legitimation Crisis (1975)
 Communication and the Evolution of Society (1976)
 On the Pragmatics of Social Interaction (1976)
 The Theory of Communicative Action (1981)
 Moral Consciousness and Communicative Action (1983)
 Philosophical-Political Profiles (1983)
 The Philosophical Discourse of Modernity (1985)
 The New Conservatism (1985)
 The New Obscurity: The Crisis of the Welfare State (1986)
 Postmetaphysical Thinking (1988)
 Justification and Application (1991)
 Between Facts and Norms: Contributions to a Discourse Theory of Law and Democracy (1992)
 On the Pragmatics of Communication (1992)
 The Inclusion of the Other (1996)
 A Berlin Republic (1997, collection of interviews with Habermas)
 The Postnational Constellation (1998)
 Religion and Rationality: Essays on Reason, God, and Modernity (1998)
 Truth and Justification (1998)
 The Future of Human Nature (2003) 
 Old Europe, New Europe, Core Europe (2005) 
 The Divided West (2006)
 The Dialectics of Secularization (2007, w/ Joseph Ratzinger)
 Between Naturalism and Religion: Philosophical Essays (2008)
 Europe. The Faltering Project (2009)
 The Crisis of the European Union (2012)
 This Too a History of Philosophy (2019)

See also

 Foucault–Habermas debate
 Positivism dispute

References

Further reading
 Gregg Daniel Miller, Mimesis and Reason: Habermas's Political Philosophy. SUNY Press, 2011.
 
 Jürgen Habermas: a philosophical—political profile by Marvin Rintala, Perspectives on Political Science, 2002-01-01
 Jürgen Habermas by Martin Matuštík (2001) 
 Postnational identity: critical theory and existential philosophy in Habermas, Kierkegaard, and Havel by Martin Matuštík (1993) 
 Thomas McCarthy, The Critical Theory of Jürgen Habermas, MIT Press, 1978.
 
 Raymond Geuss, The Idea of a Critical Theory, Cambridge University Press, 1981.
 
 J.G. Finlayson, Habermas: A Very Short Introduction, Oxford University Press, 2004.
 
 Jane Braaten, Habermas's Critical Theory of Society, State University of New York Press, 1991. 
 Thomas Kupka, Jürgen Habermas' diskurstheoretische Reformulierung des klassischen Vernunftrechts, Kritische Justiz 27 (1994), pp. 461–469
 
 Andreas Dorschel: 'Handlungstypen und Kriterien. Zu Habermas' Theorie des kommunikativen Handelns, in: Zeitschrift für philosophische Forschung 44 (1990), nr. 2, pp. 220–252. A critical discussion of types of action in Habermas. In German.
 Erik Oddvar Eriksen and Jarle Weigard, Understanding Habermas: Communicative Action and Deliberative Democracy, Continuum International Publishing, 2004.
 
 Alexandre Guilherme and W.John Morgan,'Habermas(1929-)-dialogue as communicative rationality', Chapter 9 in Philosophy, Dialogue, and Education: Nine modern European philosophers,Routledge, London and New York, pp. 140– 154. .
 Detlef Horster. Habermas: An Introduction. Pennbridge, 1992
 Martin Jay, Marxism and Totality: The Adventures of a Concept from Lukacs to Habermas (Chapter 9), University of California Press, 1986.
 Ernst Piper (ed.) "Historikerstreit": Die Dokumentation der Kontroverse um die Einzigartigkeit der nationalsozialistschen Judenvernichtung, Munich: Piper, 1987, translated into English by James Knowlton and Truett Cates as Forever In The Shadow Of Hitler?: Original Documents Of the Historikerstreit, The Controversy Concerning The Singularity Of The Holocaust, Atlantic Highlands, N.J.: Humanities Press, 1993 
 Edgar, Andrew. The Philosophy of Habermas. Мontreal, McGill-Queen's UP, 2005.
 Adams, Nicholas. Habermas & Theology. Cambridge, Cambridge University Press, 2006.
 Mike Sandbothe, Habermas, Pragmatism, and the Media, Online publication: sandbothe.net 2008; German original in: Über Habermas. Gespräche mit Zeitgenossen, ed. by Michael Funken, Darmstadt: Primus, 2008.
 Müller-Doohm, Stefan. Jürgen Habermas. Frankfurt, Suhrkamp, 2008 (Suhrkamp BasisBiographie, 38).
 Moderne Religion? Theologische und religionsphilosophische Reaktionen auf Jürgen Habermas. Hrsg. v. Knut Wenzel und Thomas M. Schmidt. Freiburg, Herder, 2009.
 Luca Corchia, Jürgen Habermas. A bibliography: works and studies (1952–2013): With an Introduction by Stefan Müller-Doohm, Arnus Edizioni – Il Campano, Pisa, 2013.
.
.
Peter Koller, Christian Hiebaum, Jürgen Habermas: Faktizität und Geltung, Walter de Gruyter	2016.

External links

 Extensive article in the Internet Encyclopedia of Philosophy
 Extensive article in the Stanford Encyclopedia of Philosophy
 Habermas Forum by Thomas Gregersen; updated bibliography, news and literature on Habermas
 Towards a United States of Europe, by Jürgen Habermas, at signandsight.com, published 27 March 2006
 How to save the quality press? Habermas argues for state support for quality newspapers, at signandsight.com, published 21 May 2007
 Habermas links collected by Antti Kauppinen (writings; interviews; bibliography; Habermas explained, discussed, reviewed; and other Habermas sites; updated 2004)
 Habermas, the Public Sphere, and Democracy: A Critical Intervention by Douglas Kellner
 Jurgen Habermas, On Society and Politics
 Juergen Habermas gives Memorial Lecture in honor of American Philosopher, Richard Rorty on 2 November 2007 5pm Cubberley Auditorium, at Stanford University. Transcript available here.
 Philosophy in a Time of Terror: Dialogues with Jürgen Habermas and Jacques Derrida

 
1929 births
20th-century atheists
20th-century essayists
20th-century German non-fiction writers
20th-century German philosophers
20th-century German historians
21st-century atheists
21st-century essayists
21st-century German non-fiction writers
21st-century German philosophers
Anti-consumerists
Atheist philosophers
Communication theorists
Continental philosophers
Corresponding Fellows of the British Academy
Critical theorists
Critics of Christianity
Critics of postmodernism
Critics of religions
Epistemologists
Fellows of the American Academy of Arts and Sciences
Fellows of the British Academy
Foreign Members of the Russian Academy of Sciences
Frankfurt School
German anti-fascists
German atheists
German ethicists
German humanists
German logicians
German male non-fiction writers
German male writers
German political philosophers
German political scientists
German sociologists
Academic staff of Goethe University Frankfurt
Gottfried Wilhelm Leibniz Prize winners
Academic staff of Heidelberg University
Historians of philosophy
Hitler Youth members
Holberg Prize laureates
Kyoto laureates in Arts and Philosophy
Living people
Mass media theorists
Members of Academia Europaea
Members of the Serbian Academy of Sciences and Arts
Metaphysicians
Northwestern University faculty
Ontologists
People from the Rhine Province
Phenomenologists
Philosophers of culture
Philosophers of education
Philosophers of history
Philosophers of language
Philosophers of law
Philosophers of logic
Philosophers of mind
Philosophers of religion
Philosophers of science
Philosophers of social science
Philosophers of technology
Philosophers of war
Philosophy academics
Philosophy writers
Political philosophers
Pragmatists
Rhetoric theorists
Rhetoricians
Scholars of nationalism
Scientists from Frankfurt
Secular humanists
German social commentators
Social philosophers
Theorists on Western civilization
University of Bonn alumni
University of Göttingen alumni
University of Marburg alumni
Academic staff of the University of Marburg
Writers about activism and social change
Writers about globalization
Writers from Düsseldorf
Max Planck Institute directors
Foreign members of the Serbian Academy of Sciences and Arts